Anthony James Cotton is a United States Air Force four-star general who serves as the 12th commander of the United States Strategic Command since 9 December 2022. He most recently served as the commander of the Air Force Global Strike Command from 27 August 2021 to 7 December 2022, having served as the deputy commander from 2019 to 2021. Prior to that, he was the president of the Air University.

Cotton is from Dudley, North Carolina, where he graduated from Southern Wayne High School in 1981. He is the son of James H. and Amy K. Cotton; his father was a chief master sergeant in the Air Force. Anthony Cotton was commissioned through ROTC at North Carolina State University in 1986, where he also earned a bachelor's degree in political science. Prior to his AFGSC service, Cotton commanded the 20th Air Force, served as deputy director of the National Reconnaissance Office, and was senior military assistant to the Under Secretary of Defense for Intelligence.

In June 2022, Cotton was nominated for reappointment as general and assignment as commander of the United States Strategic Command. He appeared for a hearing before the Senate Committee on Armed Services on 15 September 2022 and was confirmed by voice vote of the full Senate on 29 September 2022. He assumed command on 9 December 2022.

Awards and decorations

Effective dates of promotions

References

External link

|-

Living people
1960s births
Place of birth missing (living people)
United States Air Force generals
Lieutenant generals
Recipients of the Air Force Distinguished Service Medal
Recipients of the Defense Superior Service Medal
Recipients of the Legion of Merit